The Asso XI was a family of water-cooled, supercharged V12 piston aeroengines produced in the 1930s by Italian manufacturer Isotta Fraschini, and fitted on a number of aircraft types built by CANT, Caproni and others.

Design and development
Isotta Fraschini produced a long series of engines with the name Asso (Ace, in English). The Asso XI R.C. was an upright, liquid-cooled V-12 engine with maximum power output in the range  depending on the degree of supercharging.

All variants of the R.C.40 had much in common with construction of the earlier Asso 750 R.C., though they had two, rather than three, banks of 6 cylinders and 4 rather than 2 valves per cylinder.  Cylinder barrels were machined from carbon steel with flat-topped heads and valve seats. Each barrel had a separate sheet steel water jacket.  Cast aluminium head blocks were bolted to each of the two banks of 6 cylinders, providing valve ports, guides, coolant passages and camshaft supports. The pistons were also aluminium castings. The crankshaft was a 6-throw design with 8 plain bearings and a double row ball thrust bearing between the front two.  The connecting rods had bronze bush little ends and white metal big ends.  The crankcase was cast in two parts, the upper one with the housings for the crankshaft bearings.

Variants
Asso XI R(R - Riduttore - reduction gear)
Asso XI R.C.(C - Compressore - supercharged)
L.121 R.C.40A version of the Asso XI,  
A.120 R.C.40 Inverted version of the L.121

Applications
CANT Z.501
CANT Z.505
CANT Z.508
CANT Z.1007
CANT Z.1011
Caproni Ca.124 idro
Caproni Ca.134
Caproni Ca.135
Caproni Ca.405
Caproni Campini N.1
IMAM Ro.45
Piaggio P.32
Piaggio P.50
SAI Ambrosini S.S.4
Savoia-Marchetti SM.79 (originally)

Specifications (R.C.40)

See also

Note

References

Asso XI
1930s aircraft piston engines